GPD may refer to:

Police departments 
 Gaithersburg Police Department, Maryland, United States
 Gatlinburg Police Department, Tennessee, United States
 Gladstone Police Department, Oregon, United States
 Greenbelt Police Department (Maryland), United States
 Guam Police Department
 Greensboro Police Department , North Carolina, United States

Other uses 
 Geassocieerde Pers Diensten, a Dutch news agency
 General purpose datatype
 Generalized Pareto distribution
 Generalized Parton Distributions
 Glyceraldehyde phosphate dehydrogenase
 Mount Gordon Airport, in Queensland, Australia
 People's Liberation Army General Political Department
 Tradewind Aviation, an American airline
 GamePad Digital, a Chinese company, creator of the GPD XD, GPD Win, GPD Win Max, GPD Win 2, GPD Win 3 and GPD Pocket